Treasure EP.3: One to All is the third extended play by South Korean boy band Ateez. It was released on June 10, 2019. It debuted at number two on the Gaon Album Chart, as well as the top 10 of the US Billboard World Albums and Top Heatseekers charts. On May 27, two performance videos were released for the tracks "Illusion" and "Wave". A fan vote was held to decide which song would be chosen as the EP's single. It was later revealed on the album's release date that both songs would serve as singles.

Track listing

Charts

Accolades

References

2019 EPs
Ateez albums